Spark (formerly 107 Spark FM and Spark FM) is a community radio station serving 15- to 30-year-olds in the Sunderland area. Spark carries a variety of content catering for both mainstream and niche musical audiences, specialising in chart hits and new music throughout the day, and specialist programming after 7 pm. The radio station broadcasts on 107.00FM and online via the station's website. The official launch of Spark took place at the new £12 million CitySpace building in the centre of the city of Sunderland.

History

The station began broadcasting in November 1997 as Radio Utopia a two-week short term broadcast under the (then) Radio Authority's Restricted Service Licence (RSL) scheme. The station was part of a regional arts festival called "Visions of Utopia" and the station reflected the scheme and carried various programmes tied-in with the scheme, such as "The Quakies" a programme produced by children from the former pit village of Quaking Houses in County Durham. Radio broadcasting predated this by several years, with student programming on the community radio station Wear FM, which closed in 1995 and is now the more commercial station Sun FM. The station was low powered but still proved valuable as a training ground for new broadcasters. Programmes were broadcast from studios in the Forster Building, formerly used by Wear FM, with a transmitter on the roof.

The station was rebranded the following November as "107 Utopia FM" and developed a more formatted sound and joined the "Student Broadcast Network" (SBN) bringing news, national programmes and a 24-hour service to the station. Utopia returned in September 1999 for the first ever freshers broadcast and again proved its value for students and volunteers. The station largely draws volunteers from the University's large undergraduate media courses but has also been part of wider community radio programmes with projects in County Durham, Washington and Sunderland.

During the following years Utopia broadcast more frequently, getting up to broadcasts twice a year. In 2002 Utopia began broadcasting on the 102.4FM frequency. In 2003 the station began to use new studios in the £11m Media Centre at the St. Peter's Campus, when media teaching moved there that year. The old studios have now been demolished and the building is now used to teach courses run by the University's School of Education and Lifelong Learning. The move also facilitated the recording of sessions in The Media Centre's new radio and television studios.

The station applied for a Community Radio Licence from OFCOM in the 2nd licensing round and was awarded a licence in 2007. The station took on the new name of Spark when it launched in 2009. The name is a reflection of the University logo, which they call a 'spark' in homage to the shipyards that were central to the growth of Sunderland.

Volunteers from the station have not only succeeded in gaining recognition in the annual student radio awards in the UK but also awards from the New York Festivals. Station alumni are now found working for BBC and Commercial stations across the UK.

Volunteers at the station are known internally and across the student radio network and media network as "Sparkies".

Community licence and rebrand
When the UK media regulator Ofcom announced a plan to issue Community Radio licences, work began at the station to apply for a Full Time licence. This application was made in early in 2007. In September 2007, Ofcom awarded Utopia FM a full-time 5 year Community Radio licence.

It was announced in June 2009 that Utopia FM would be changing its name to 107 Spark FM to signal the change in licence and the broadening of the audience.

In 2012, Spark was awarded 'Best North East Radio Station' in the Radio Academy's 'Nations & Regional Awards'.

In late 2013, the '107' branding was removed for the station and the station was simply known as 'Spark' or 'Spark FM'.

In 2015, the station was updated with a refreshed logo,  a slogan change to 'Where Sunderland Lives', new on-air imaging provided by Reelworld and a brand new website.

As of 2016, the station is now referred to as 'Spark' only on air, dropping the 'fm' suffix.

Programming, music and output

The majority of Spark's programming is broadcast live from its studio at the David Puttnam Media Centre at St.Peters Campus of University of Sunderland. Spark broadcasts at least eight hours of original programming each weekday, while overnights are non-stop music. Daytime shows feature a mix of playlist music, interviews, discussions and news reporting.

Spark play a mix of hit music and emerging music. Genres range from Chart Hits, Indie/Alternative, Dance, Urban/R&B. During the evening, 7pm-11pm Spark have a number of specialist music shows, such as 'The Takedown', focusing on different genres.

The station airs hourly national IRN news updates during daytime hours.

Awards
2012 Radio Academy Nations & Regional Awards, "Best North East Radio Station"
2012 New York Festivals "World's Best Radio Programs", Silver Award winner

Notable alumni 
A number of Spark volunteers have graduated from the University of Sunderland and gone on to work for local, regional or national radio stations as well as TV stations and print media.

 Jordan North (2009-2011): co-host of Drivetime on BBC Radio 1 (via Capital Manchester and Rock FM)
 Emma Millen (2016-2021): BBC Radio 1, BBC Radio Newcastle  
 Jordan Blyth (2016-2021): Radio X, BBC Tees

References

External links

City of Sunderland
Community radio stations in the United Kingdom
Radio stations established in 1997
Radio stations in North East England
Student radio in the United Kingdom
University of Sunderland